This list is of the Cultural Properties of Japan designated in the category of  for the Circuit of Hokkaidō.

National Cultural Properties
As of 31 July 2019, twenty-two Important Cultural Properties (including one *National Treasure) have been designated, being of national significance; this number includes two Important Cultural Properties that were excavated in Hokkaidō and are now in the collection of Tokyo National Museum.

Prefectural Cultural Properties
As of 5 September 2019, twenty-five properties have been designated as being of prefectural importance.

See also
 Cultural Properties of Japan
 List of National Treasures of Japan (archaeological materials)
 List of Historic Sites of Japan (Hokkaidō)
 List of Cultural Properties of Japan - historical materials (Hokkaidō)
 List of Cultural Properties of Japan - paintings (Hokkaidō)
 Hokkaido Museum

References

External links
  Cultural Properties in Hokkaidō

History of Hokkaido
Culture in Hokkaido
Archaeological materials, Hokkaido
Hokkaido,Cultural Properties